Abu Anees Muhammad Barkat Ali (ابو انیس محمد برکت علی لودھیانوی) (27 April 1911 – 26 January 1997) was a Muslim Sufi who belonged to the Qadri spiritual order.  He was the founder of the non-political, non-profit, religious organisation, Dar-ul-Ehsan. Abu Anees followers spread all around the world and especially in Pakistan. He spent his whole life preaching Islam. He made first Quran Mahal in Pakistan. A large number of people including politicians and officers come Darul Ehsaan to meet Sufi Barkat Ali. His tomb is situated 16 km far from Faisalabad near dasuha on Faisalabad–Samundri Road Faisalabad. Every year, eye camps are arranged at Darul Ehsan in which free eye treatments are provided for many people every year in the month of March and October

Early life
His father, Nigahi Bakhsh, was an employee of the British Army.

Literary works
"His literary work is notable in the Muslim world and his name is also included in the List of Muslim writers and poets." He wrote more than 400 books on different topics including religion, ethics and philosophy.
 Makshoofat Manazal-e-Ehsan, 5 volumes
 Kitab-ul-Amal Bis-Sunnah 5 volumes
 Asma-un-Nabi-ul-Kareem, 6 volumes
 Maqalat-e-Hikmat 30 volumes
 Zikr-e-Elahi

Death
Sufi Barkat Ali Ludhianwi (QSA) died on 26 January 1997, 16th Ramadan ul mubarik 1417 (AH) at the age of 85. He is buried in Faisalabad.

Honorary postage stamp
On 27 April 2013, Pakistan Post office issued a stamp with a denomination of Rupees 8 under its "Men of Letters" series in honour of Sufi Barkat Ali.

See also
Baba Qaim Sain
Baba Noor Shah Wali
Baba Lasoori Shah
Molna Saradr Ahmad

References

External links
 Videoclips of Barkat Ali Ludhianwi interviews
 https://www.darulehsanpublications.net

1911 births
1997 deaths
20th-century Muslim scholars of Islam
Pakistani writers
Islamic philosophers
Sufi poets
Sufi mystics
Pakistani Sufis
Qadiri order
Scholars from Ludhiana